Herbert Hawkins may refer to:
 Herbert Hawkins (politician), English-born Australian politician
 Herbert Hawkins (cricketer), English cricketer
 Herbert Leader Hawkins, British geologist